White South Africans generally refers to South Africans of European descent. In linguistic, cultural, and historical terms, they are generally divided into the Afrikaans-speaking descendants of the Dutch East India Company's original settlers, known as Afrikaners, and the Anglophone descendants of predominantly British colonists of South Africa. In 2016, 57.9% were native Afrikaans speakers, 40.2% were native English speakers, and 1.9% spoke another language as their mother tongue, such as Portuguese, Greek, or German. White South Africans are by far the largest population of White Africans. White was a legally defined racial classification during apartheid.

Most Afrikaners trace their ancestry back to the mid-17th century and have developed a separate cultural identity, including a distinct language. The majority of English-speaking White South Africans trace their ancestry to the 1820 British, Irish, and Dutch settlers. The remainder of the White South African population consists of later immigrants from Europe such as Greeks and Jews from Lithuania and Poland. Portuguese immigrants arrived after the collapse of the Portuguese colonial administrations in Mozambique and Angola, although many also originate from Madeira.

History
The history of White settlement in South Africa started in 1652 with the settlement of the Cape of Good Hope by the Dutch East India Company (VOC) under Jan van Riebeeck. Despite the preponderance of officials and colonists from the Netherlands, there were also a number of French Huguenots fleeing religious persecution at home and German soldiers or sailors returning from service in Asia. The Cape Colony remained under Dutch rule for two more centuries, after which it was annexed by the United Kingdom around 1806. At that time, South Africa was home to about 26,000 people of European ancestry, a relative majority of whom were still of Dutch origin. However, the Dutch settlers grew into conflict with the British government over the abolition of the slave trade and limits on colonial expansion into African lands. In order to prevent a frontier war, the British Parliament decided to send British settlers to start farms on the eastern frontier. Beginning in 1818 thousands of British settlers arrived in the growing Cape Colony, intending to join the local workforce or settle directly on the frontier. Ironically most of the farms failed due to the difficult terrain, forcing the British settlers to encroach on African land in order to practice pastoralism. About a fifth of the Cape's original Dutch-speaking white population migrated eastwards during the Great Trek in the 1830s and established their own autonomous Boer republics further inland. Nevertheless, the population of white ancestry (mostly European origin) continued increasing in the Cape as a result of settlement, and by 1865 had reached 181,592 people. Between 1880 and 1910, there was an influx of Jews (mainly via Lithuania) and immigrants from Lebanon and Syria arriving in South Africa. Recent immigrants from the Levant region of Western Asia were originally classified as Asian, and thus "non-white", but, in order to have the right to purchase land, they successfully argued that they were "white". The main reason being that they were from the lands where Christianity and Judaism originated from, and that the race laws did not target Jews, who were also a Semitic people. Therefore arguing that if the laws targeted other people from the Levant, it should also affect the Jews.

The first nationwide census in South Africa was held in 1911 and indicated a white population of 1,276,242. By 1936, there were an estimated 2,003,857 white South Africans, and by 1946 the number had reached 2,372,690. The country began receiving tens of thousands of European immigrants, namely from Germany, Italy, the Netherlands, Greece, and the territories of the Portuguese Empire during the mid- to late twentieth century. South Africa's white population increased to over 3,408,000 by 1965, reached 4,050,000 in 1973, and peaked at 5,044,000 in 1990.

The number of white South Africans resident in their home country began gradually declining between 1990 and the mid-2000s as a result of increased emigration.

Whites continue to play a role in the South African economy and across the political spectrum. The current number of white South Africans is not exactly known, as no recent census has been measured, although the overall percentage of up to 9% of the population represents a decline, both numerically and proportionately, since the country's first non-racial elections in 1994. Just under a million white South Africans are also living as expatriate workers abroad, which forms the majority of South Africa's brain drain.

Apartheid era

Under the Population Registration Act of 1950, each inhabitant of South Africa was classified into one of several different race groups, of which White was one. The Office for Race Classification defined a white person as one who "in appearance obviously is, or who is generally accepted as a white person, but does not include a person who, although in appearance obviously a white person, is generally accepted as a coloured person." Many criteria, both physical (e.g. examination of head and body hair) and social (e.g. eating and drinking habits, a native speaker of English, Afrikaans or a another European language) were used when the board decided to classify someone as white or coloured. This was virtually extended to all those considered the children of two white persons, regardless of appearance. The Act was repealed on 17 June 1991.

Post-apartheid era
In an attempt at post-Apartheid redress, the Employment Equity Act of 1994, legislation promotes employment of people (Black Africans, Indian, Chinese, Coloured and White population groups, as well as disabled people) according to the representation of their racial group as a proportion of the total South African population. Black Economic Empowerment legislation further empowers blacks as the government considers ownership, employment, training and social responsibility initiatives, which empower black South Africans, as important criteria when awarding tenders; private enterprises also must adhere to this legislation. Some reports indicate a growing number of whites in poverty compared to the pre-apartheid years and attribute this to such laws – a 2006 article in The Guardian stated that over 350,000 Afrikaners may be classified as poor, and alluded to research claiming that up to 150,000 were struggling for survival.

As a consequence of Apartheid policies, Whites are still widely regarded as being one of 4 defined race groups in South Africa. These groups (blacks, whites, Coloureds and Indians) still tend to have strong racial identities, and to identify themselves, and others, as members of these race groups and the classification continues to persist in government policy due to attempts at redress like Black Economic Empowerment and Employment Equity.

Diaspora and emigration

Since the 1990s, there has been a significant emigration of whites from South Africa. Between 1995 and 2005, more than one million South Africans emigrated, citing violence as the main reason, as well as the lack of employment opportunities for whites.

Current trends

In recent decades, there has been a steady proportional decline in South Africa's white community, due to higher birthrates among other South African ethnic groups, as well as a high rate of emigration. In 1977, there were 4.3 million whites, constituting 16.4% of the population at the time. As of 2016, it is estimated that at least 800,000 white South Africans have emigrated since 1995.

Like many other communities strongly affiliated with the West and Europe's colonial legacy in Africa, white South Africans were in the past often economically better off than their black African neighbours and have surrendered political dominance to majority rule. There were also some white Africans in South Africa who lived in poverty—especially during the 1930s and increasingly since the end of minority rule. Current estimates of white poverty in South Africa run as high as 12%, though fact-checking website Africa Check described these figures as "grossly inflated" and suggested that a more accurate estimate was that "only a tiny fraction of the white population – as few as 7,754 households – are affected."

The new phenomenon of white poverty is mostly blamed on the government's affirmative action employment legislation, which reserves 80% of new jobs for black people and favours companies owned by black people (see Black Economic Empowerment). In 2010, Reuters stated that 450,000 whites live below the poverty line according to Solidarity and civil organisations, with some research saying that up to 150,000 are struggling for survival. However, the proportion of white South Africans living in poverty is still much lower than for other groups in the country, since approximately 50% of the general population fall below the upper-bound poverty line.

A further concern has been crime. Some white South Africans living in affluent white suburbs, such as Sandton, have been affected by the 2008 13.5% rise in house robberies and associated crime. In a study, Johan Burger, senior researcher at the Institute for Security Studies (ISS), said that criminals were specifically targeting wealthier suburbs. Burger explained that several affluent suburbs are surrounded by poorer residential areas and that inhabitants in the latter often target inhabitants in the former. The report also found that residents in wealthy suburbs in Gauteng were not only at more risk of being targeted but also faced an inflated chance of being murdered during the robbery.

The global financial crisis slowed the high rates of white people emigrating overseas and has led to increasing numbers of white emigrants returning to live in South Africa. Charles Luyckx, CEO of Elliot International and a board member of the Professional Movers Association, stated in December 2008 that emigration numbers had dropped by 10% in the six months prior. Meanwhile, "people imports" had increased by 50%.

In May 2014, Homecoming Revolution estimated that around 340,000 white South Africans had returned to South Africa in the preceding decade.

Furthermore, immigration from Europe has also supplemented the white population. The 2011 census found that 63,479 white people living in South Africa were born in Europe; of these, 28,653 had moved to South Africa since 2001.

At the end of apartheid in 1994, 85% of South Africa's arable land was owned by whites. The land reform program introduced after the end of apartheid intended that, within 20 years, 30% of white-owned commercial farm land should be transferred to black owners. Thus, in 2011, the farmers' association, Agri South Africa, coordinated efforts to resettle farmers throughout the African continent. The initiative offered millions of hectares from 22 African countries that hoped to spur development of efficient commercial farming. The 30 percent target was not close to being met by the 2014 deadline. According to a 2017 government audit, 72% of the nation's private farmland is owned by white people. In February 2018, the Parliament of South Africa passed a motion to review the property ownership clause of the constitution, to allow for the expropriation of land, in the public interest, without compensation, which was supported within South Africa's ruling African National Congress on the grounds that the land was originally seized by whites without just compensation. In August 2018, the South African government began the process of taking two white-owned farmlands. Western Cape ANC secretary Faiez Jacobs referred to the property clause amendment as a "stick" to force dialogue about the transfer of land ownership, with the hope of accomplishing the transfer "in a way that is orderly and doesn't create a 'them' and 'us' [situation]."

Demographics

The Statistics South Africa Census 2011 showed that there were about 4,586,838 white people in South Africa, amounting to 8.9% of the country's population. This was a 6.8% increase since the 2001 census. According to the Census 2011, South African English is the first language of 36% of the white population group and Afrikaans is the first language of 61% of the white population group. The majority of white South Africans identify themselves as primarily South African, regardless of their first language or ancestry.

Religion

Approximately 87% of white South Africans are Christian, 9% are irreligious, and 1% are Jewish. The largest Christian denomination is the Dutch Reformed Church (NGK), with 23% of the white population being members. Other significant denominations are the Methodist Church (8%), the Roman Catholic Church (7%), and the Anglican Church (6%).

Migrations
Many white Africans of European ancestry have migrated to South Africa from other parts of the continent due to political or economic turmoil in their respective homelands. Thousands of Portuguese Mozambicans, Portuguese Angolans, and white Zimbabweans emigrated to South Africa during the 1970s and 1980s. However, the overwhelming majority of European migration correlated with the historic colonization of the region (some migrating for the purpose of extraction of resources, minerals and other lucrative elements found in South Africa, others for a better life and farming opportunities without many restrictions in newly colonised lands).

Meanwhile, many white South Africans have also emigrated to Western countries over the past two decades, mainly to English-speaking countries such as the United Kingdom, Australia and New Zealand. However, the financial crisis has slowed the rate of emigration and in May 2014, the Homecoming Revolution estimated that around 340,000 white South Africans had returned in the preceding decade.

Distribution

According to Statistics South Africa, white South Africans make up 7.7% (2022) of the total population in South Africa. Their actual proportional share in municipalities is likely to be higher, given the undercount in the 2001 census.

The following table shows the distribution of white people by province, according to the 2011 census:

Politics

White South Africans continue to participate in politics, having a presence across the whole political spectrum from left to right.

Former South African President Jacob Zuma commented in 2009 on Afrikaners being "the only white tribe in a black continent or outside of Europe which is truly African", and said that "of all the white groups that are in South Africa, it is only the Afrikaners that are truly South Africans in the true sense of the word." These remarks have led to the Centre for Constitutional Rights (CCR) laying a complaint with the Human Rights Commission against Zuma. According to the CCR's spokesman, Zuma's remarks constituted "unfair discrimination against non-Afrikaans-speaking, white South Africans....."

In 2015, a complaint was investigated for hate speech against Jacob Zuma who said "You must remember that a man called Jan van Riebeeck arrived here on 6 April 1652, and that was the start of the trouble in this country."

Former South African President Thabo Mbeki stated in one of his speeches to the nation that: "South Africa belongs to everyone who lives in it. Black and White."

Prior to 1994, a white minority held complete political power under a system of racial segregation called apartheid. During apartheid, immigrants from Taiwan, South Korea, and Japan were considered honorary whites in the country, as the government had maintained diplomatic relations with these countries. These were granted the same privileges as white people, at least for purposes of residence. Some African Americans such as Max Yergan were granted an "honorary white" status as well.

Statistics

Historical population 
Statistics for the white population in South Africa vary greatly. Most sources show that the white population peaked in the period between 1989 and 1995 at around 5.2 to 5.6 million. Up to that point, the white population largely increased due to high birth rates and immigration. Subsequently, between the mid-1990s and the mid-2000s, the white population decreased overall. However, from 2006 to 2013, the white population increased.

Fertility rates 
Contraception among white South Africans is stable or slightly falling: 80% used contraception in 1990, and 79% used it in 1998.
The following data shows some fertility rates recorded during South Africa's history. However, there are varied sources showing that the white fertility rate reached below replacement (2.1) by 1980. Likewise, recent studies show a range of fertility rates, ranging from 1.3 to 2.4. The Afrikaners tend to have a higher birthrate than that of other white people.

Life expectancy 
The average life expectancy at birth for males and females

Unemployment

Income 
Average annual household income by population group of the household head.

Percentage of workforce

Languages

Religion 
Religion among white South Africans remains high compared to other white ethnic groups, but likewise it has shown a steady proportional drop in both membership and church attendance with until recently the majority of white South Africans attending regular church services.

Notable White South Africans

Science and technology
 Christiaan Barnard, surgeon who performed first successful human heart transplant
 Mike Botha, diamond cutter and educator; Yves Landry Award for Outstanding Innovation in Education, Canada
 Peter Sarnak, Princeton's Eugene Higgins professor of mathematics, specialising in number theory
 Stanley Skewes, mathematician whose work in number theory produced the record breaking Skewes number
 Percy Deift, mathematician specialising in analysis
 Sydney Brenner, biologist; Nobel Prize, Physiology/Medicine 2002
 Michael Levitt, biophysicist; Nobel Prize, Chemistry 2013
 Allan McLeod Cormack, physicist; Nobel Prize, Medicine 1979
 Gordon Murray, designer of Formula One race cars, including the Championship winning McLaren MP4/4 and the ultra-exclusive McLaren F1 Roadcar
 Elon Musk, entrepreneur and engineer: SpaceX, Tesla Motors, and PayPal; wealthiest person in the world as of August 2022
 Basil Schonland, physicist
 Mark Shuttleworth, founder of Ubuntu, a Linux based computer Operating system; first African in space
 Neil Turok, cosmologist
 George F. R. Ellis, cosmologist
 Max Theiler, virologist; Nobel Prize, Medicine 1951
 Phillip Tobias, palaeo-anthropologist
Seymour Papert, pioneer of artificial intelligence

Military
 Flight Lieutenant Andrew Beauchamp-Proctor VC, DSO, MC and bar, DFC fighter ace, 1st World War
 Major William Bloomfield VC, South African East African campaign, 1st World War
 Captain William Faulds VC MC, Delville Wood, 1st World War
 Major John Frost DFC, South African Air Force fighter ace during the Second World War
 Lieutenant Colonel Reginald Frederick Johnson Hayward VC, Western Front, 1st World War
 Captain Petrus Hugo DSO DFC, fighter ace, Second World War
 Squadron Leader Albert Gerald Lewis DFC, South African fighter ace, 2nd World War
 Adolph "Sailor" Malan, Second World War ace fighter pilot
 Squadron Leader John Dering Nettleton VC, Battle of Britain
 Major Oswald Reid VC, 1st World War
 Captain Clement Robertson VC, Western Front
 Lieutenant Colonel John Sherwood-Kelly VC CMG DSO, Second Boer War, Bambatha Rebellion, 1st World War
 Captain Quentin Smythe VC, North Africa 2nd World War
 Major Edwin Swales VC DFC, pilot during the Second World War
 Lieutenant Kevin Winterbottom HC, South African Air Force
 Staff Sergeant Danny Roxo HC, 32 Battalion, South African Army
 General Constand Viljoen SSA SD SOE SM MMM MP, former South African military chief and former leader of the Freedom Front Plus
Air Vice Marshal John Frederick George Howe, CB, CBE, AFC (26 March 1930 – 27 January 2016)

Royalty and aristocracy 
 Charlene, Princess of Monaco
 Bruce Murray, 12th Duke of Atholl

Arts and media

 Jani Allan, columnist and radio commentator
 Melinda Bam, Miss South Africa 2011
 Joyce Barker, opera singer - soprano
 David Benatar, philosopher, academic and author
 Carl Beukes, actor
 David Bateson, voice actor in the Hitman video game series
 Bok van Blerk, singer
 Neill Blomkamp, director
 Herman Charles Bosman, writer
 Johan Botha, opera singer - tenor
 Breyten Breytenbach, writer and painter
 Andre Brink, novelist
 Johnny Clegg, musician noted for performing in Juluka and Savuka
 Penelope Coelen, Miss World 1958
 Mimi Coertse, soprano - opera singer
 J. M. Coetzee, novelist; Nobel Prize, Literature 2003
 Megan Coleman, Miss South Africa 2006
 Elizabeth Connell, opera singer - mezzo soprano, soprano
 Sharlto Copley, actor
 John Cranko, ballet dancer and choreographer
 Robyn Curnow, CNN International's anchor
 Riaan Cruywagen, South African International News anchor, TV presenter and voice artist
 Frederick Dalberg, opera singer - bass
 Embeth Davidtz, actress, South African-American, born to South African parents in Indiana
 Kurt Darren, singer
 Theuns Jordaan, South African singer
 Izak Davel, actor, dancer, singer and model
 André Lötter, actor, emcee/ anchor & speaker
 Die Antwoord, band; rap-rave group formed in Cape Town
 Collette Dinnigan, South African born fashion designer.
 Kim Engelbrecht, actress
 Elisabeth Eybers, poet
 Duncan Faure, singer-songwriter and musician
 Nicole Flint, Miss South Africa 2008
 Athol Fugard, playwright
 Edwin Gagiano, South African-born actor, model, filmmaker, singer-songwriter based in Los Angeles.
 Dean Geyer, actor and singer
 Goldfish, electronic duo originating from Cape Town.
 Nadine Gordimer, writer; Nobel Prize, Literature 1991
 Stefans Grové, composer and writer
 Cariba Heine, actress
 François Henning, singer
 Sonja Herholdt, recording artist
 Jacques Imbrailo, opera singer - baritone
 Sid James, actor, Carry On team
 Trevor Jones, composer
 Ingrid Jonker, poet
 John Joubert, composer
 Peter Klatzow, composer
 Gé Korsten, opera singer - tenor, actor
 Alice Krige, actress
 Antjie Krog, writer
 Kongos; rock band
 Caspar Lee, YouTuber, actor
 Josh Pieters, Youtuber
 Locnville, electro hop music duo
 Lara Logan, journalist and war correspondent
 Eugène Nielen Marais, poet, writer, lawyer and naturalist
 Monica Mason, ballet dancer and director of the Royal Ballet
 Dalene Matthee, writer
 Dave Matthews, Grammy Award-winning singer-songwriter
 Deon Meyer, writer
 Shaun Morgan, singer and guitarist for the rock band Seether
 Marita Napier, opera singer - soprano
 Anton Nel, pianist
 Demi-Leigh Nel-Peters, Miss Universe 2017
 The Parlotones, indie rock band from Johannesburg
 Alan Paton, writer
 Graham Payn, actor, singer
 Madelaine Petsch, actress, model, YouTuber
 Sasha Pieterse, actress in the hit ABC family series Pretty Little Liars
 Brendan Peyper, singer
 Tanit Phoenix, actress, fashion model
 Hubert du Plessis, composer
 William Plomer, novelist, poet and literary editor
Sir Laurens van der Post, controversial author, conservationist, explorer, journalist and confidant to The Prince of Wales
 Behati Prinsloo, model
 Trevor Rabin, musician and composer, member of the rock band Yes
 Basil Rathbone, actor
 J. R. Rotem, productor, songwriter and music publisher
 Neil Sandilands, actor, director and cinematographer
 Stelio Savante American Movie Award-winning and SAG-nominated actor
 Shortstraw, indie rock band from Johannesburg
 Olive Schreiner, South African writer, remembered for her novel The Story of an African Farm (1883).
 Leon Schuster, comedian, filmmaker, actor, presenter and singer
 Sir Antony Sher, actor
 Troye Sivan, YouTuber, singer (half Australian)
 Cliff Simon, actor and athlete
 Phyllis Spira, ballerina, Prima Ballerina Assoluta
 Winston Sterzel, YouTuber, first China vlogger and cofounder of ADVChina
 Gerhard Steyn, singer
 Miriam Stockley, singer
 Rolene Strauss, Miss World 2014
 Tammin Sursok, actress, born in South Africa, but raised in Australia
 Candice Swanepoel, model.
 Esta TerBlanche, actress and model
 Charlize Theron, Academy Award-winning actor
 ZP Theart, former singer for the British power metal band DragonForce, former singer for the American rock band Skid Row and singer for the British heavy metal band I Am I
 Elize du Toit, actress
 Jakob Daniël du Toit, poet
 Pieter-Dirk Uys, performer and satirist, creator of Evita Bezuidenhout
 Musetta Vander, actress
 Kevin Volans, composer and pianist
 Arnold Vosloo, actor
 Casper de Vries, comedian
 Justine Waddell, actress
 Deon van der Walt, opera singer - tenor
 Kyle Watson, record producer and DJ.
 Amira Willighagen, soprano and philanthropist
 Arnold van Wyk, composer
 N. P. van Wyk Louw, poet
 Jean-Philip Grobler, South African-born musician and singer from a New York-based Indietronica band St. Lucia (musician).

Business
 Etienne de Villiers, investor; media and sports executive
 Ivan Glasenberg, CEO of Glencore Xstrata, one of the world's largest commodity trading and mining companies
 Sol Kerzner, accountant and business magnate mainly in the casino resort sector
 Harry Oppenheimer, chairman of Anglo American Corporation for 25 years and De Beers Consolidated Mines for 27 years
 Nicky Oppenheimer, chairman of the De Beers diamond mining company and its subsidiary, the Diamond Trading Company
 Anton Rupert, founder of the Rembrandt Group
 Johann Rupert, chairman of the Swiss-based luxury-goods company Richemont and South Africa-based company Remgro
 Desmond Sacco, Chairman and managing director of Assore Limited
 Christo Wiese, consumer Retail business magnate

Politics
 Louis Botha, farmer, soldier, statesman; first Prime Minister of South Africa
 P. W. Botha, former State President of South Africa
 F. W. de Klerk, former State President of South Africa
 Marike de Klerk, former First Lady of South Africa, murdered in her home in 2001
 Sir Patrick Duncan Governor-General at the start of the Second World War
 Ruth First, anti-apartheid activist and scholar
 Sir James Percy FitzPatrick, author, politician and businessman
 Derek Hanekom, Deputy Minister of Technology; prominent ANC member of Parliament
 Nicholas Haysom, Former legal adviser to Nelson Mandela, former United Nations Special Representative to Afghanistan
Geordin Hill-Lewis, Mayor of Cape Town
Sandra Laing, white girl reclassified as "Coloured" during the apartheid era
 D. F. Malan, former Prime Minister of South Africa
 Pieter Mulder, former Deputy Minister of Agriculture, Forestry, Fisheries; leader of the Freedom Front Plus
 Andries Pretorius, former leader of the Voortrekkers who was instrumental in the creation of the South African Republic
 Harry Schwarz, lawyer, politician, diplomat and anti-apartheid leader
 Joe Slovo, former leader of the South African Communist Party played key part in constitutional negotiations in the 1990s
 Field Marshal Jan Smuts, soldier, politician and former Prime Minister of South Africa during both World Wars. Only person to sign both world War peace treaties on the winning side.
 Jan Steytler, first leader of Progressive Party of South Africa, former MP
 Helen Suzman, anti-apartheid activist and former MP, solo anti-apartheid parliamentarian from 1961 to 1974 representing Progressive Party (South Africa), served on first Independent Electoral Commission supervising first non-racial national elections in South Africa
 Colin Eglin, former leader of the Progressive Party (South Africa) and its successors and former MP, played key role in building up parliamentary opposition to apartheid in the 1970s and 1980s, and in constitutional negotiations in the 1990s
 Zach de Beer, former Progressive Party (South Africa) MP, subsequent leader of Democratic Party and post-apartheid ambassador to The Netherlands, also played key part in constitutional negotiations in the 1990s
 Rick Crouch, City Councillor in the eThekwini Metropolitan Municipality
 Eugène Terre'Blanche, former leader of the Afrikaner Weerstandsbeweging; murdered
 Andries Treurnicht, former Leader of the Opposition (South Africa) from 1987 to 1993
 Marthinus van Schalkwyk, previous Minister of Tourism and ANC member of Parliament; played a key role in merging the National Party into the ANC
 Hendrik Verwoerd, former Prime Minister of South Africa; primary architect of Apartheid; assassinated in Cape Town, in the House of Assembly
 Helen Zille, former leader of the Democratic Alliance and Premier of the Western Cape

Sport

 Andrew Surman
 Willem Alberts, professional rugby player
 Kevin Anderson, professional tennis player
 Clive Barker, former footballer and football coach, led the South Africa national football team to victory in the 1996 African Cup of Nations
 Matthew Booth, former footballer
 Francois Botha, professional boxer
 Michael Botha, professional rugby player
 Mark Boucher, former professional cricketer
 Vincent Breet, rower
 Okkert Brits, former pole vaulter, holds the African record and only African in the "6 metres club"
 Schalk Brits, professional rugby player
 Zola Budd, former track and field runner, broke the world record in the women's 5000 m twice in under three years
 Schalk Burger, former professional rugby player
 Jan-Henning Campher, rugby player
 Bradley Carnell, former footballer
 Gerrie Coetzee, former boxer, first boxer from Africa to win a world heavyweight title
 Tony Coyle, former footballer
 Hansie Cronje, professional cricketer
 Lood de Jager, professional rugby player
 Faf de Klerk, professional rugby player
 Quinton de Kock, professional cricketer
 Roger De Sá, former footballer
 AB de Villiers, former cricketer

 Giniel de Villiers, racing driver and winner of the 2009 Dakar Rally
 Jean de Villiers, former professional rugby player
 Allan Donald, professional cricketer
 Faf du Plessis, professional cricketer
 Natalie du Toit, paralympian swimmer
 Pieter-Steph du Toit, professional rugby player
 Thomas du Toit, professional rugby player
 Ernie Els, professional golfer, former World No. 1 and winner of four Majors
 Eben Etzebeth, professional rugby player
 Brett Evans, former footballer and current football coach
 Paul Evans, former footballer
 Rowen Fernández, former footballer
 Lyndon Ferns, former swimmer and gold medallist in the 4x100m freestyle relay at the 2004 Summer Olympics
 Wayne Ferreira, former tennis player
 Mark Fish, former footballer
 Dean Furman, footballer, captain of South African team
 Retief Goosen, professional golfer, twice US Open champion
 Penny Heyns, former swimmer, the only woman in the history of the Olympic Games to have won both the 100 m and 200 m breaststroke events, at the 1996 Summer Olympics
 Pierre Issa, former footballer
 Liam Jordan, footballer
 Steven Kitshoff, professional rugby player
 Vincent Koch, professional rugby player
 Johan Kriek, former professional tennis player and winner of the 1981 Australian Open
 Jesse Kriel, professional rugby player
 Patrick Lambie, former professional rugby player
 Grant Langston, former professional motocross rider who competed in Europe and the US
 Chad le Clos, swimmer and gold medalist in the 200m butterfly at the 2012 Summer Olympics in London
 Raymond Leppan, professional wrestler, formerly signed with World Wrestling Entertainment performing under the name "Adam Rose"
 Paul Lloyd Jr., professional wrestler, formerly signed with World Wrestling Entertainment where he performed under the name Justin Gabriel
 Francois Louw, professional rugby player
 Calvin Marlin, former footballer
 Malcolm Marx, professional rugby player
 Victor Matfield, former professional rugby player
 Hank McGregor, surf skier and kayak marathon champion
 Elana Meyer, former long-distance runner, set 15 km road running and half marathon African records
 Percy Montgomery, former rugby union player and current record holder for both caps and points for the Springboks
 Albie Morkel, cricketer
 Morne Morkel, cricketer
 Franco Mostert, professional rugby player
 Karen Muir, former swimmer
 Franco Naudé, professional rugby player
 Ryk Neethling, former swimmer and gold medallist in the 4x100m freestyle relay at the 2004 Summer Olympics
 Ricardo Nunes, footballer
 Louis Oosthuizen, professional golfer, winner of 2010 Open Championship
 François Pienaar, former captain of the Springboks, leading South Africa to victory in the 1995 Rugby World Cup
 Kevin Pietersen, former England international cricketer
 Gary Player, professional golfer
 Oscar Pistorius, former paralympic athlete; convicted of the murder of his girlfriend
 Handré Pollard, professional rugby player
 Jacques Potgieter, former professional rugby player
 Gary Player, former professional golfer, widely regarded as one of the greatest players in the history of golf
 André Pretorius, former rugby player
 Cobus Reinach, professional rugby player
 Jonty Rhodes, professional cricketer
 Glen Salmon, former footballer
 Corrie Sanders, in 2003 became the WBO heavyweight champion; murdered in 2012
 Jody Scheckter, former Formula One auto-racer and winner of 1979 Formula One season
 Louis Schreuder, professional rugby player
 Roland Schoeman, swimmer and gold medallist in the 4x100m freestyle relay at the 2004 Summer Olympics
 Charl Schwartzel, professional golfer and winner of the 2011 Masters Tournament
 Dillon Sheppard, former footballer
 Jan Serfontein, professional rugby player
 Dillon Sheppard, former footballer
 John Smit, former captain of the Springboks, leading South Africa to victory in the 2007 Rugby World Cup
 Graeme Smith, former captain of the Proteas
 Kwagga Smith, professional rugby player
 R.G. Snyman, professional rugby player
 Dale Steyn, cricket pace bowler
 Carla Swart, collegiate cyclist, won nineteen individual and team cycling titles
 Eric Tinkler, former footballer
 Neil Tovey, former captain of the South Africa national football team, leading the team to victory in the 1996 African Cup of Nations
 Darian Townsend, swimmer and gold medallist in the 4x100m freestyle relay at the 2004 Summer Olympics
 Andrew Tucker, former footballer
 Hans Vonk, former footballer, South Africa's first choice goalkeeper during 1998 Fifa World Cup
 Cameron van der Burgh, swimmer who represented South Africa at the 2008 Summer Olympics and at the 2012 Summer Olympics winning gold at the 100-meter breaststroke in a new world record
 Rassie van der Dussen, professional cricketer
 Janine van Wyk, footballer and captain of South Africa women's national football team
 Duane Vermeulen, professional rugby player
 Douglas Whyte, horse racing jockey, 13-time Hong Kong champion jockey
 Ivan Winstanley, former footballer
 Kaylene Corbett, South African professional swimmer
 Lara van Niekerk, South African professional swimmer
 Neil Winstanley, former footballer
 Pieter Coetze, South African professional swimmer
 Tatjana Schoenmaker, South African professional swimmer

Other
 Mariette Bosch, murderer executed by the government of Botswana in 2001 for the murder of South African Ria Wolmarans
 Henri van Breda, murderer who killed his parents and brother in January 2015

See also

 White Africans of European ancestry
 Bantu peoples of South Africa
 Coloureds
 Cape Malay
 Afrikaners
 History of South Africa
 Portuguese South Africans
 Greek South Africans
 Huguenots in South Africa
 1820 settlers
 Italian South Africans
 Irish diaspora
 Khoisan
 Asian South Africans
 Indian South Africans
 Japanese South Africans
 Chinese South Africans
 Serbs in South Africa
 Norwegian South Africans
 German South Africans
 History of the Jews in South Africa
 Racism in South Africa

References

 
 
 
South Africa
Ethnic groups in South Africa